László Bene (1924 – July 1977) was a Hungarian boxer. He competed in the men's heavyweight event at the 1952 Summer Olympics.

References

1924 births
1977 deaths
Hungarian male boxers
Olympic boxers of Hungary
Boxers at the 1952 Summer Olympics
Martial artists from Budapest
Heavyweight boxers
20th-century Hungarian people